Accuminulia longiphallus is a species of moth of the family Tortricidae. It was first described by John W. Brown in 1999 and is found in Chile.

The length of the forewings is 6.5–7.8 mm for males and about 6.1 mm for females. The forewings are grey, with irregular tan, black and cream overscaling and irrorations (speckles). The basal area of the hindwings is covered by modified cream-white sex scaling. The distal part is pale grey brown.

Etymology
The species name refers to the comparatively long aedeagus of the species.

References

Moths described in 1999
Euliini
Fauna of Chile
Moths of South America
Endemic fauna of Chile